Carl R. Feld was a member of the Wisconsin State Assembly.

Biography
Born on December 14, 1858, Feld graduated from what is now Northwestern University Pritzker School of Law. He died in 1914.

Career
Feld was elected to the Assembly in 1885, 1886 and 1888. He was a Democrat.

References

External links

Wisconsin lawyers
Northwestern University Pritzker School of Law alumni
1858 births
1914 deaths
Burials in Wisconsin
19th-century American lawyers
Democratic Party members of the Wisconsin State Assembly